Vladimir Afanasyevich Obruchev (Klepenino near Rzhev, Tver Oblast, Russian Empire – June 19, 1956, Moscow, USSR) was a Russian and Soviet geologist who specialized in the study of Siberia and Central Asia. He was also one of the first Russian science fiction authors.

Scientific research
Vladimir Obruchev graduated from the Petersburg Mining Institute in 1886. His early work involved the study of gold-mining, which led him to come up with a theory explaining the origin of gold deposits in Siberia. He also gave advice on construction of the Central Asian and Trans-Siberian Railways and consulted Sven Hedin on his projected journey to Siberia. While working for the railway, Obruchev explored the Karakum Desert, the shores of the Amu Darya River, and the old riverbeds of the Uzbois. He also worked as a geologist on Lake Baikal, on the Lena River, and in gold fields near the Vitim.

Between 1892 and 1894, Obruchev "was a member of the Grigory Potanin's expedition into ... Mongolia, [and] to the mountains of Nan Shan and Northern China." He also explored the Transbaikal area, Dzhungaria, and Altai. Largely as a result of his participation in this expedition he became interested in loess and made considerable contributions to the study of loess deposits.

In 1929, Obruchev was elected to the Academy of Sciences of the USSR.

Having spent half a century in exploring Siberia and Inner Asia, Obruchev summarized his findings with a three-volume monograph, The Geology of Siberia (1935–1938), followed by The History of Geological Exploration of Siberia. Many of his works deal with the origins of loess in Central Asia and Siberia, ice formation and permafrost in Siberia, problems of Siberian tectonics, and Siberian goldfields. He also authored many popular scientific works, such as Formation of Mountains and Ore Deposits (1932), Fundamentals of Geology (1944), Field Geology (1927), Ore Deposits (1928–1929), and others. All together, Obruchev authored
over a thousand scientific works, among which are a most extensive geological study of Siberia and a five-volume history of the geological exploration of Siberia, which have been awarded the Lenin Prize as well as the prizes and medals of several scientific societies.

He was the director of the Geological Institute (1930-1933) and the Permafrost Institute (1939-1956) of the Academy of Sciences of the USSR.

During 1954, he completed an extensive geographical study of Nan Shan Mountains in China based on his own and previous expeditions to the region and spent his last years working up a geological study of the mountains.

Popular fiction

In his native country Obruchev is best known as the author of two perennially popular science fiction novels, Plutonia (Плутония, 1915) and Sannikov Land (Земля Санникова, 1924). Both of these stories, imitating the pattern of Arthur Conan Doyle's The Lost World, depict in vivid detail the discovery of an isolated world of prehistoric animals in hitherto unexplored large islands north of Alaska or Siberia. In Plutonia, dinosaurs and other Jurassic species are found in a fictional underground area north of Alaska. The descriptive passages are made more credible by Obruchev's extensive knowledge of paleontology. "Sannikov Land" is named for a phantom island of the Arctic Ocean, reported historically by Yakov Sannikov in 1811. Paul J. McAuley praised the novel in a 1999 column, saying "It's true that the characters are indistinguishably wooden mouthpieces for the author's opinions, and the plot is pure pulp, but all this is redeemed by the novel's rigorous scientific sensibility."

During the Soviet period, Obruchev attempted to emulate Edwardian models of boys' adventure stories in his novels Golddiggers in the Desert (1928) and In the Wilds of Central Asia (1951).

Official positions
 Professor of the Tomsk Engineering Institute (1919–1921),
 Professor of the Taurida University in Simferopol (1918–1919),
 Professor of the Moscow Mining Academy (1921–1929);
 Member of the Soviet Academy of Sciences (1929);
 Chairman of the Committee on Permafrost Studies (since 1930);
 Director of the Institute of Permafrost Studies of the Soviet Academy of Sciences (since 1939);
 Secretary of the Department of Geological and Geographical Sciences of the Soviet Academy of Sciences (1942–1946);
 Honorary president of the Soviet Geographical Society (since 1948)

Awards and honors
 The Przhevalsky Prize
 Two Chikhachov Prizes from the French Academy of Sciences (1898 and 1925)
 The Constantine Medal of the Russian Geographical Society (1900)
 The first ever Karpinsky Gold Medal (1947)
 The Lenin Prize (1926)
 The Stalin Prizes (1941, 1950)
 Five Orders of Lenin
 Order of the Red Banner of Labour, and numerous medals.
 Hero of Socialist Labor (1945)

Obruchev namesakes

 Obruchevite, a mineral.
 Akademik Obruchev Range in Tuva
 A mountain in the upper reaches of the Vitim River
 An oasis in Antarctica
 Obruchev Hills, a group of rounded hills in Antarctica
 Obruchev (crater) on the Moon
 Mount Obruchev, a mountain in Antarctica
 The Obruchev Prize was established by the Soviet Academy of Sciences in 1938 to honor best works in the field of Siberian geology.
 Vladimir Obruchev – oil and gas research vessel: built at Kirov yard, Khabarovsk; will operate in Caspian Sea.

Family
Two of his sons also became notable scientists:
 Sergei Obruchev, a geologist, discovered the Chersky Range in Siberia.
 Dmitry Obruchev, a paleontologist, was a leading authority on early vertebrates.

Bibliography

 Fundamentals Of Geology, Foreign Languages Publishing House, Moscow. From Archive.org
 (1924) Plutoniya (Плутония); English translation: Plutonia (1957), Moscow: Raduga Publishers, 
 (1926) Zemlya Sannikova (Земля Санникова); English translation: Sannikov Land (1988), Moscow: Raduga Publishers,

References

External links

 
 Obruchev V. A. in Complete Dictionary of Scientific Biography

1863 births
1956 deaths
People from Rzhevsky District
People from Tver Governorate
Central Asian studies scholars
Explorers of Central Asia
Explorers of Siberia
Explorers from the Russian Empire
Heroes of Socialist Labour
Geographers from the Russian Empire
Geologists from the Russian Empire
Paleontologists from the Russian Empire
Science fiction writers from the Russian Empire
Soviet geographers
Soviet geologists
Soviet science fiction writers
Soviet male writers
20th-century Russian male writers
Soviet scientists
Recipients of the USSR State Prize
Academic staff of Tomsk Polytechnic University
Full Members of the USSR Academy of Sciences
Burials at Novodevichy Cemetery
Saint Petersburg Mining University alumni